The 23rd annual Billboard Latin Music Awards which honor the most popular albums, songs, and performers in Latin music took place in Miami.

Artist of the Year
 Enrique Iglesias
 Juan Gabriel
 Romeo Santos—WINNER
 Nicky Jam

Artist of the Year, New
    Ariel Camacho y Los Plebes del Rancho—WINNER
    La Séptima Banda
    Banda Clave Nueva de Max Peraza
    Maluma

Tour of the Year
    Enrique Iglesias & Pitbull
    Romeo Santos
    Juan Gabriel—WINNER
    Ricardo Arjona

Social Artist of the Year
    Enrique Iglesias
    Shakira—WINNER
    Prince Royce
    Romeo Santos

Crossover Artist of the Year
    Ed Sheeran 
    Omi
    Justin Bieber—WINNER
    The Weeknd

Hot Latin Song of the Year
    Los Plebes del Rancho de Ariel Camacho, “Te Metiste”
    J Balvin, “Ginza”
    Nicky Jam feat. Enrique Iglesias, “El Perdón”—WINNER
    Romeo Santos, “Propuesta Indecente”

Hot Latin Song of the Year, Vocal Event
    Mana & Shakira, “Mi Verdad”
    Nicky Jam feat. Enrique Iglesias, “El Perdón”—WINNER
    Farruko feat. Shaggy, Nicky Jam “Sunset”
    Gente de Zona feat. Marc Anthony, “La Gozadera”

Hot Latin Songs Artist of the Year, Male
    Enrique Iglesias
    J Balvin
    Nicky Jam
    Romeo Santos—WINNER

Hot Latin Songs Artist of the Year, Female
    Natalia Jimenez
    Jennifer Lopez
    Shakira—WINNER
    Natti Natasha

Hot Latin Songs Artist of the Year, Duo or Group
    Banda Sinaloense MS De Sergio Lizárraga—WINNER
    Ariel Camacho y Los Plebes del Rancho 
    Calibre 50
    Julion Alvarez y Su Norteno Banda

Hot Latin Songs Label of the Year
    DEL
    Sony Music Latin—WINNER
    Remex
    Universal Music Latin Entertainment

Hot Latin Songs Imprint of the Year
    Capitol Latin
    DEL
    Fonovisa
    Sony Music Latin—WINNER

Airplay Song of the Year
    J Balvin, “Ginza”
    Nicky Jam feat., Enrique Iglesias “El Perdón”—WINNER
    Romeo Santos, “Hilito”
    Zion & Lennox, “Pierdo La Cabeza”

Airplay Label of the Year
    DEL
    Sony Music Latin 
    Universal Music Latin Entertainment—WINNER
    Warner Latina

Airplay Imprint of the Year
    Disa
    Capitol Latin
    Sony Music Latin—WINNER
    Fonovisa

Digital Song of the Year
    J Balvin, “Ginza”
    Gente de Zona feat. Marc Anthony, “La Gozadera”
    Nicky Jam & Enrique Iglesias, “El Perdón”—WINNER
    J Balvin, “Ay Vamos”

Streaming Song of the Year
    Banda Sinaloense MS de Sergio Lizárraga, “Háblame de Ti”
    Banda Sinaloense MS de Sergio Lizárraga, “Mi Razón de Ser”
    J Balvin, “Ay Vamos”
    Nicky Jam & Enrique Iglesias “El Perdón”—WINNER

Top Latin Album of the Year
    Ricky Martin, A Quien Quiera Escuchar
    Juan Gabriel, Los Dúo—WINNER
    Gerardo Ortiz, Hoy Más Fuerte
    Maná, Cama Incendiada

Latin Compilation Album of the Year
    Varios/Various, 20 Bandazos de Oro: Puros Éxitos
    Varios/Various, De Puerto Rico Para El Mundo
    Varios/Various, Las Bandas Románticas de América 2016—WINNER
    Varios/Various, Latin Hits 2016: Club Edition

Top Latin Albums Artist of the Year, Male
    Gerardo Ortiz
    Joan Sebastian
    Juan Gabriel—WINNER
    Ricky Martin

Top Latin Albums Artist of the Year, Female
    Ana Gabriel
    Chiquis Rivera
    Selena—WINNER
    Natalia Jiménez

Top Latin Albums Artist of the Year, Duo or Group
     Maná—WINNER
    Calibre 50
    Julión Álvarez y Su Norteño Banda
    Los Plebes del Rancho de Ariel Camacho

Top Latin Albums Label of the Year
    Columbia
    Lizos
    Warner Latina
    Universal Music Latin Entertainment—WINNER

Top Latin Albums Imprint of the Year
    Musart
    Disa
    Fonovisa—WINNER
    Sony Music Latin

Latin Pop Song of the Year
    Christian Daniel, “Ahora Que Te Vas”
    Juanes, “Juntos”
    Ricky Martin feat.Yotuel “La Mordidita” 
    Maná & Shakira “Mi Verdad”—WINNER

Latin Pop Songs Artist of the Year, Solo
    Christian Daniel
    Enrique Iglesias—WINNER
    Juanes
    Ricky Martin

Latin Pop Songs Artist of the Year, Duo or Group
    Chino & Nacho
    Mana—WINNER
    Ha*Ash
    Jesse & Joy

Latin Pop Airplay Label of the Year
    Summa
    Sony Music Latin—WINNER
    Universal Music Latin Entertainment
    Warner Latina

Latin Pop Airplay Imprint of the Year
    Capitol Latin
    Sony Music Latin—WINNER
    Universal Music Latino
    Warner Latina

Latin Pop Album of the Year
    Ricky Martin, A Quien Quiera Escuchar
    Juan Gabriel, Los Dúo—WINNER
    Juan Gabriel, Mis Número 1 ... 40 Aniversario
    Maná, Cama Incendiada

Latin Pop Albums Artist of the Year, Solo
    Marco Antonio Solís
    Juan Gabriel—WINNER
    Ricky Martin
    Selena

Latin Pop Albums Artist of the Year, Duo or Group
    Maná—WINNER
    Grupo Nueva Vida
    Il Divo
    Jesse & Joy

Latin Pop Albums Label of the Year
    Columbia
    Sony Music Latin
    Universal Music Latin Entertainment—WINNER
    Warner Latina

Latin Pop Albums Imprint of the Year
    Universal Music Latino
    Fonovisa 
    Sony Music Latin—WINNER
    Warner Latina

Tropical Song of the Year
    Gente de Zona feat.Marc Anthony, “La Gozadera"—WINNER
    Victor Manuelle, “No Quería Engañarte”
    Romeo Santos, “Hilito”
    Romeo Santos & Marc Anthony, “Yo También”

Tropical Songs Artist of the Year, Solo
    Prince Royce
    Marc Anthony
    Victor Manuelle 
    Romeo Santos—WINNER

Tropical Songs Artist of the Year, Duo or Group
    ChocQuibTown
    Ilegales
    Gente de Zona—WINNER
    Grupo Manía

Tropical Songs Airplay Label of the Year
    Pina
    Kiyavi
    Sony Music Latin—WINNER
    Top Stop

Tropical Songs Airplay Imprint of the Year
    Kiyavi
    Sony Music Latin—WINNER
    Top Stop
    Pina

Tropical Album of the Year
    Aventura, Sólo Para Mujeres
    Buena Vista Social Club, Lost and Found
    Victor Manuelle, Que Suenen Los Tambores—WINNER
    Gilberto Santa Rosa, Necesito Un Bolero

Tropical Albums Artist of the Year, Solo
    Gilberto Santa Rosa
    Marc Anthony
    Romeo Santos—WINNER
    Victor Manuelle

Tropical Albums Artist of the Year, Duo or Group
    Aventura
    Buena Vista Social Club—WINNER
    Pirulo y La Tribu
    El Gran Combo de Puerto Rico

Sello Discográfico del Año, “Tropical Albums” Tropical Albums Label of the Year
    Warner Bros.
    Planet Records
    Sony Music Latin—WINNER
    Universal Music Latin Entertainment

Tropical Albums Imprint of the Year
    Kiyavi
    Top Stop
    Premium Latin
    Sony Music Latin—WINNER

Regional Mexican Song of the Year
    Banda Clave Nueva de Max Peraza, “Cuál Adiós”
    Banda Sinaloense MS de Sergio Lizárraga, “Háblame de Ti” 
    Ariel Camacho y Los Plebes del Rancho, “Te Metiste”—WINNER
    Julión Álvarez y Su Norteño Banda, “El Amor de Su Vida”

Regional Mexican Songs Artist of the Year, Solo
    Gerardo Ortiz
    El Komander—WINNER
    Remmy Valenzuela
    Roberto Tapia

Regional Mexican Songs Artist of the Year, Duo or Group
    Banda Sinaloense MS de Sergio Lizárraga—WINNER
    Calibre 50
    Julión Álvarez y Su Norteño Banda
    Los Plebes del Rancho de Ariel Camacho

Regional Mexican Airplay Label of the Year
    DEL
    Remex
    Sony Music Latin
    Universal Music Latin Entertainment—WINNER

Regional Mexican Airplay Imprint of the Year
    DEL
    Disa
    Fonovisa—WINNER
    Remex

Regional Mexican Album of the Year
    Calibre 50, Lo Mejor De...
    Julión Álvarez y Su Norteño Banda, El Aferrado
    Various, Las Bandas Románticas de América 2015
    Gerardo Ortiz, Hoy Más Fuerte—WINNER

Regional Mexican Albums Artist of the Year, Solo
    Chiquis Rivera
    Gerardo Ortiz
    Joan Sebastian—WINNER
   Vicente Fernández

Regional Mexican Albums Artist of the Year, Duo or Group
    Banda Sinaloense MS de Sergio Lizárraga
    Calibre 50 
    Julión Álvarez y Su Norteño Banda—WINNER
    Los Plebes del Rancho de Ariel Camacho

Regional Mexican Albums Label of the Year
    Remex
    Lizos
    Sony Music Latin
    Universal Music Latin Entertainment—WINNER

Regional Mexican Albums Imprint of the Year
    DEL
    Disa
    Fonovisa—WINNER
    Musart

Latin Rhythm Song of the Year
    Zion & Lennox, “Pierdo La Cabeza”
    J Balvin, “Ginza”
    Maluma, “Borro Cassette”
    Nicky Jam & Enrique Iglesias, “El Perdón"—WINNER

Latin Rhythm Songs Artist of the Year, Solo
    Daddy Yankee
    Farruko
    Nicky Jam—WINNER
    J Balvin

Latin Rhythm Songs Artist of the Year, Duo or Group
    Alexis & Fido
    Baby Rasta & Gringo
    Plan B
    Zion & Lennox—WINNER

Latin Rhythm Airplay Label of the Year
    Baby
    Sony Music Latin—WINNER
    Pina
    Universal Music Latin Entertainment

Latin Rhythm Airplay Imprint of the Year
    Capitol Latin
    Melodías de Oro
    Sony Music Latin—WINNER
    Pina

Latin Rhythm Album of the Year
    Don Omar, Last Don ll
    Pitbull, Dale—WINNER
    Tony Dize, La Melodía de la Calle, 3rd Season
    Yandel, Legacy: De Líder a Leyenda Tour

Latin Rhythm Albums Artist of the Year, Solo
    Farruko
    Pitbull, -- WINNER
    Don Omar
    Yandel

Latin Rhythm Albums Artist of the Year, Duo or Group
    Baby Rasta & Gringo
    Kinto Sol
    Wisin & Yandel 
    Plan B  -- WINNER

Latin Rhythm Albums Label of the Year
    Cinq
    Sony Music Latin—WINNER
    La Industria
    Universal Music Latin Entertainment

Latin Rhythm Albums Imprint of the Year
    Sony Music Latin—WINNER
    Machete
    Mr. 305/Famous Artist
    Pina

Songwriter of the Year
    Romeo Santos—WINNER
    Horacio Palencia Cisneros 
    Sergio Mercado
    Nicky Jam

Publisher of the Year
    Mayimba Music, Inc., ASCAP—WINNER
    Palabras De Romeo, ASCAP
    Sony/ATV Discos Music Publishing LLC, BMI
    Universal – Música Unica Publishing, BMI

Publishing Corporation of the Year
    El Productions LLC
    Sony/ATV Music—WINNER
    Universal Music
    Warner/Chappell Music

Producer of the Year
    Romeo Santos
    Jesús Jaime González Terrazas
    Saga WhiteBlack—WINNER
    Jesús Tirado Castañeda

Billboard Lifetime achievement award
Marco Antonio Solís

Billboard Latin Music Hall of Fame
Alejandro Fernández

References

Billboard Latin Music Awards
Latin Billboard Music Awards
Latin Billboard Music Awards
Latin Billboard Music Awards
Latin Billboard Music